Modern Love is the second album by the New Zealand electropop band Kids of 88, released worldwide on 5 October 2012.

Reception
Scott Kara of The New Zealand Herald wrote, "Kids of 88 return with a more mature new album" and "they are no less ambitious this time round with the release of [a] second album".

Singles
"Tucan", the first single, was released digitally on 11 May 2012.
"LaLa", the second single, was released 24 August 2012. "LaLa" was commissioned onto radio on 17 August 2012, one week before the official release. The song peaked at number 30 on the RIANZ New Zealand Singles Chart. The second single was originally meant to be "Bad Talk" after receiving funding for the music video by NZ On Air.
"The Drug" first received music video funding from NZ On Air for a music video, suggesting that it would be the third single from the album. On 16 November 2012, the song was available from the iTunes Store as a single.
"Bad Talk" received music video funding from NZ On Air shortly after "Tucan" was released, suggesting that it would be the second single from the album. However, "LaLa" became the second and "The Drug" the third. On 6 April 2013, the band announced a music video was to be released for "Bad Talk" and it was released on 24 July 2013.

Track listing

References

External links
 

2012 albums
Kids of 88 albums